The 1977 Spanish Grand Prix was a Formula One motor race held on 8 May 1977 at the Circuito del Jarama near Madrid, Spain. It was the fifth race of the 1977 World Championship of F1 Drivers and the 1977 International Cup for F1 Constructors.

The 75-lap race was won from pole position by American driver Mario Andretti, driving a Lotus-Ford. Argentinian Carlos Reutemann finished second in a Ferrari, with South African Jody Scheckter third in a Wolf-Ford.

Report
Mario Andretti continued his recent form with pole position and Jacques Laffite's Ligier springing a surprise, beating Niki Lauda to second, however Lauda was unable to take part in the race due to a broken rib. At the start, Andretti took the lead with Laffite following. Laffite gave chase to Andretti in the early stages but had to pit with a deflating tyre, leaving Andretti to romp to victory with Carlos Reutemann second. Hunt inherited third but retired with a misfire, giving it to John Watson until he lost places due to a spin and eventually retired with fuel system problems, leaving Jody Scheckter to take the final spot on the podium.

The race marked the debut of the Williams Grand Prix Engineering team, entering a single March 761 chassis for Belgian driver Patrick Nève, who finished 12th.

Classification

Qualifying

Race

Championship standings after the race

Drivers' Championship standings

Constructors' Championship standings

References

Spanish Grand Prix
Spanish Grand Prix
1977 in Spanish motorsport
Spanish